Alfred Miller Baud (20 September 1892 – 5 December 1986) was an Australian rules footballer who played with Carlton in the Victorian Football League (VFL).

Baud was born in Nagambie and went to school there. After leaving school, he went to Bendigo for his first job in the Post Office and later moved to Melbourne.

Baud first played with Carlton with 1913 and during his three-season career was a member of two premiership sides. The first came in 1914 when he played on the wing in the club's Grand Final victory and the other came the following season. He was captain in the 1915 Grand Final due to Billy Dick being suspended and started the game at half back.

Soon after he joined the military, enlisting with the 5th Division as a signaller. After serving in Egypt and France, he was seriously wounded with a shrapnel injury to the head at Anzac Ridge in 1917, leaving him with reduced sight. The surgeons put a silver plate in his head that stayed in place for the remainder of his life. Baud's war service and injury is mentioned in sports journalist Martin Flanagan's 2003 collection of essays The Game in Time of War.

After the war he resumed work with the Post Office, and served for 50 years as a telegraphist and postmaster including long terms at the Ascot Vale and North Melbourne Post Offices.

His interest with football continued with Baud spending 19 years on the VFL tribunal. In 1937 he served as chairman of selectors for Carlton Football Club, and they won their first VFL Premiership since 1915.

References

External links

Bluseum profile
Ozsportshistory profile
Baud family history

1892 births
1986 deaths
Australian rules footballers from Victoria (Australia)
Australian Rules footballers: place kick exponents
Carlton Football Club players
Carlton Football Club Premiership players
Eaglehawk Football Club players
Australian Army soldiers
Australian military personnel of World War I
Two-time VFL/AFL Premiership players
Military personnel from Victoria (Australia)
Australian postmasters